The 1980 West Texas State Buffaloes football team was an American football team that represented West Texas State University (now known as West Texas A&M University) as a member of the Missouri Valley Conference during the 1980 NCAA Division I-A football season. In their fourth year under head coach Bill Yung, the team compiled a 5–6 record (2–4 in the MVC).

Schedule

References

West Texas State
West Texas A&M Buffaloes football seasons
West Texas State Buffaloes football